Christopher Buckley (22 May 1905 – 12 August 1950) was a British journalist and historian working for The Daily Telegraph newspaper.

Buckley studied military history at Oxford before he started as a war correspondent in 1940. His reporting from battles and front lines in World War II earned him international prestige. He was the author of Road to Rome, An Account of Military Operations in Italy, 1943–44 (1945) and wrote official accounts of military operations (e.g., the History of the Second World War) for His Majesty's Stationery Office (HMSO). He was the author of two novels, Rain Before Seven (1947) and Royal Chase (1949). The first of these has been described as "something of a forgotten late golden age classic" in the crime fiction field.

In 1950, while reporting from the Korean War, he was killed (with journalist Ian Morrison and Colonel M. K. Unni Nayar) by a landmine exploding under their jeep. He is buried at the United Nations Memorial Cemetery in Busan, South Korea.

Richard Knott's 2015 book The Trio is an account of Buckley's work as a war correspondent and his friendships with Alexander Clifford and Alan Moorehead.

References

External links
 
 

British male journalists
British war correspondents
The Daily Telegraph people
Journalists killed while covering the Korean War
Alumni of the University of Oxford
1905 births
1950 deaths
Landmine victims
20th-century English businesspeople